M-Audio (formerly Midiman) is a business unit of inMusic Brands that designs and markets audio and MIDI interfaces, keyboards and MIDI controllers, synthesizers, loudspeakers, studio monitors, digital DJ systems, microphones, and music software. The company has independent offices in the US, Canada, UK, Germany, France and Japan.

History

Midiman

M-Audio was founded in the late 1990s by Tim Ryan, an engineer and graduate of the California Institute of Technology who had co-designed the Con Brio Advanced Digital Synthesizer and helped develop MIDI software for Commodore and Apple computers, including two of the best-selling MIDI software titles at that time, Studio One and Studio Two. After founding the company as Music Soft and changing the name to Midiman due to Yamaha Corporation already owning the rights to the Music Soft name, Ryan began the company with hardware solutions designed to solve the challenges of connecting MIDI, audio, and computer equipment together for the purposes of music production.

Midiman first established itself as a manufacturer of small, affordable MIDI problem solvers, sync devices, and interfaces. The first Midiman product was named the "Midiman," a MIDI-to-tape recorder synchronizer, but the first products that experienced mainstream success were the Syncman and Syncman Pro VITC-to-LTC/MTC converters. The next products of note were the Midisport and Bi-Port range of MIDI interfaces which were far more commercially successful than any other Midiman product to date, and which established a core product category for the company for many years to come.

Following the commercial success of the MIDI interface line, Midiman introduced the Flying Cow and Flying Calf A/D / D/A converters, and entered the audio interface product category for the first time with the 4-input, 20-bit DMAN 2044.

Growth, re-branding and Avid acquisition
In the year 2000 and in conjunction with the announcement of the Delta Series PCI audio interfaces, Midiman introduced "M-Audio" as the new brand for their audio products. In the years following, Midiman grew business further by entering into distribution deals with Propellerhead Software, Ableton, ArKaos, and Groove Tubes microphones, The success of the Midiman and M-Audio products, combined with the distribution revenues, resulted in 128% growth for the company in 2001 and 68% growth in 2002, making Midiman the fastest-growing music company in the US for both of those years.

Having now established themselves in the MIDI interface and audio interface product categories, Midiman entered the MIDI keyboard controller market in 2002 with the introduction of the portable 25-key Oxygen8. While not the first 25-key MIDI controller nor the first cost-effective keyboard controller with plenty of hardware MIDI controls, the Oxygen8 helped establish the new category of portable keyboard controller, and a significant product category for M-Audio in the years to come. Similarly, the same year marked M-Audio's entry to the studio monitor speaker market with the Studiophile SP5B. Later that same year, Midiman officially re-branded themselves entirely as M-Audio, the brand they'd been using for their audio division since 1999.

In 2003, Midiman acquired Evolution Electronics LTD, manufacturer of MIDI controllers, as a wholly owned subsidiary, and continued to sell Evolution-branded MIDI controllers and keyboards. The following year, Avid Technology acquired Midiman, Inc. (which was, at that time, doing business as M-Audio). Avid paid approximately $174 million, or nearly eight times the book value of the company. The payment was in the form of $80 million in cash, approximately 2 million shares of Avid common stock issued, and all M-Audio stock options assumed. Tim Ryan continued on with the company as general manager.

2005–2011
After Avid purchased M-Audio, Digidesign and M-Audio cooperated to release a limited version of Digidesign's flagship product, Pro Tools, that was compatible with M-Audio's affordable audio interface hardware. This version of Pro Tools was named Pro Tools M-Powered. M-Audio's products continued to be aimed at computer-based home recording enthusiasts, with more and more emphasis on portability and hardware controllers for music software, like Trigger Finger, an early USB MIDI pad controller which utilized a 4x4 grid of 16 pads to trigger sounds via MIDI, the iControl controller for GarageBand, and the ProjectMix I/O integrated control surface/audio interface. The company's keyboard controller range expanded to 3 different sizes of Oxygen-series keyboard, the more affordable and more modestly featured Keystation series, and later the premium Axiom series USB MIDI keyboard controllers.

Audio interfaces remained a dominant category for M-Audio as well, with ongoing versions of the Delta series PCI interfaces, the FastTrack series USB audio interfaces, and the ProFire series firewire audio interfaces, among others. Similarly, studio reference monitors remained a strong category, and included the Studiophile BX series, Studiophile CX series, and premium Studiophile DSM series monitors, along with the consumer electronics-targeted AV series desktop speakers.

M-Audio also branched out into new product categories. In 2005, M-Audio released Black Box, a guitar processor and audio interface with guitar amp modeling, beat-synced effects, and drum tracks for computer based recording that they had co-developed with Roger Linn Design. A digital stage piano, the ProKeys 88, introduced M-Audio to an instrument category. A partnership with Ultimate Ears brought about M-Audio IE-series earphones, and M-Audio joined the handheld digital audio recorder market with the MicroTrack series. With the introduction of Torq and its related hardware, M-Audio established itself in the growing digital DJ category.

Sale to inMusic (2012-present)
In mid-2012, Avid sold M-Audio to inMusic as part of an attempt to streamline operations and reduce operating costs. Along with its consumer music hardware products, inMusic also acquired the AIR software group's IP and engineering team, responsible for many of the virtual instruments and plug-ins for the Pro Tools audio production software platform. Avid retained the Mbox range of audio interfaces and some other formerly M-Audio-brand products.

Artists
M-Audio products are utilized by a wide range of artists, producers, and composers, including; Accordion-SuperStar Emir Vildic, 9th Wonder, The Black Eyed Peas, Narensound, Brian Transeau, Coldcut, Depeche Mode, Pharrell Williams, Evanescence, Jimmy Chamberlin, Gary Numan, Mark Isham, Los Lobos, Carmen Rizzo, Jeff Rona, Tom Scott, Skrillex, Chester Thompson, and The Crystal Method and many others

Timeline of product releases
 1989 Syncman & Syncman Pro MIDI-to-Tape synchronizers
 1996 AudioBuddy microphone preamp
 1996 MultiMixer 6 & Micromixer 18 mini mixers
 1996 GMan General MIDI module
 1997 Digipatch12X6 digital patchbay
 1998 Midisport, BiPort
 1999 SAM (1999) mixer/S/PDIF-ADAT converter
 1999 
 1998 Flying Cow, Flying Calf A/D / D/A converters
 2000 Delta 66, Delta DiO 2496, Delta 1010 audio interfaces
 2000 SuperDAC 2496 digital audio converter
 2002 Oxygen 8 USB MIDI keyboard controller
 2002 Studiophile SP-5B nearfield studio monitors
 2002 Sonica USB audio interface
 2002 Midisport Uno 
 2002 
 2002 USB Duo
 2003 Transit USB mobile audio interface.
 2003 ProSessions Sound + Loop Libraries
 2003 Ozone 25-key USB MIDI keyboard controller/control surface and audio interface.
 2003 Audiophile USB audio & MIDI interface
 2003 BX5 active nearfield reference studio monitors
 2003 Solaris large diaphragm condenser microphone
 2004 Evolution X-Session USB MIDI DJ control surface.
2004 Ozonic (37-key MIDI and audio interface over FireWire)
 2004 Luna large-diaphragm cardioid microphone
 2004 Firewire 410 firewire audio interface
 2004 Octane 8-channel preamp with digital output
 2004 Keystation Pro 88 88-key MIDI keyboard controller
 2004 Nova microphone
 2004 Firewire Audiophile firewire audio interface
 2004 Firewire 1814 firewire audio interface
 2005 Black Box
 2005 Trigger Finger USB trigger pad controller
 2005 iControl control surface for GarageBand
 2005 ProKeys 88 digital stage piano
 2006 MidAir and MidAir 37 wireless MIDI system and controller keyboard
 2006 ProjectMix I/O integrated control surface/audio interface
 2007 NRV10 Firewire mixer/audio interface
 2007 Fast Track Ultra 8x8 USB and audio interface
 2007 IE-40 reference earphones
 2008 Pulsar II small-diaphragm condenser microphone
 2011 Venom 49-key VA synthesizer
 2013 M3-8 
 2014 Oxygen MKIV series 
 2014 Trigger Finger Pro 
 2014 M3-6 
 2014 HDH50 Headphones 
 2014 BX6 Carbon, BX8 Carbon 
 2014 M-Track II, Plus II 
 2014 M-Track Eight 
 2015 CODE series (25, 49, 61) 
 2015 Deltabolt 1212 
 2015 M40 Headphones 
 2015 M50 Headphones 
 2016 CTRL49 
 2016 M-Track 2x2, 2x2M 
 2017 M3-8 Black 
 2017 Hammer 88 
 2017 BX5 D3, BX8 D3 
 2017 Uber Mic 
 2018 AV32 
 2018 Keystation MK3 (Mini 32, 49, 61, 88) 
 2019 AIR series (Hub, 192|4, 192|6, 192|8, 192|14) 
 2020 BX3, BX4 
 2021 M-Track Solo, Duo 
 2021 Oxygen MKV series 
 2021 Oxygen Pro series 
 2021 Hammer 88 Pro 
 2022 BX3BT, BX4BT

Current products

Audio & MIDI interfaces

M-Track Solo
M-Track Duo
AIR 192|4
AIR 192|6
AIR 192|8
AIR 192|14
AIR 192|4 Vocal Studio Pro
AIR Hub
M-Track Eight
Midisport Uno

Keyboard controllers
Oxygen 25, 49, 61 MKV
Hammer 88 Pro
Oxygen Pro 25, 49, 61, Mini 32
Hammer 88
Keystation MK3 49, 61, 88, Mini 32
Oxygen 25, 49, 61 MKIV

Studio monitors 

 BX3BT
 BX4BT
 BX3
 BX4
 BX5 D3
 BX8 D3
 AV32
 BX5 GRAPHITE 
 BX8 GRAPHITE

Microphones 

 Uber Mic
 Nova

Accessories 

 HDH-40 (Over-ear studio monitoring headphones)
 Bass Traveler (Portable headphone amplifier)
 SP-1 (Sustain pedal)
 SP-2 (Piano style sustain pedal)
 EX-P (Universal expression controller pedal)

Free software
Some M-Audio products in the PCI Audio Interface category contain chipsets which support free software, notably the ICE 1712 chipset. Version 2.6 of the Linux kernel supports M-Audio cards through ALSA without custom configuration or installation of proprietary applications or firmware.

M-Audio Pro Sessions releases

 Pro Sessions vol 01 - Discrete Drums :World Rock Drums & Percussion
 Pro Sessions vol 02 - Discrete Drums :R'n'B Drums and Percussion
 Pro Sessions vol 03 - These Drums Are Loud
 Pro Sessions vol 04 - World Beat Cafe
 Pro Sessions vol 05 - Latin Element
 Pro Sessions vol 06 - Latin Street
 Pro Sessions vol 07 - Hydrosonix 1
 Pro Sessions vol 08 - Hydrosonix 2
 Pro Sessions vol 09 - Hella Bumps 1
 Pro Sessions vol 10 - Hella Bumps 2
 Pro Sessions vol 11 - Mechanically Separated
 Pro Sessions vol 12 - Electro Crash
 Pro Sessions vol 13 - Vector Field
 Pro Sessions vol 14 - Sounds Logickal
 Pro Sessions vol 15 - Elektron: Machine Drum
 Pro Sessions vol 16 - Alien Radio
 Pro Sessions vol 17 - AdrenaLinn Guitars
 Pro Sessions vol 18 - Hard Desert Breaks
 Pro Sessions vol 19 - Underground SoundSystem
 Pro Sessions vol 20 - Ambient Alchemy :Open Source
 Pro Sessions vol 21 - Skillz 2 Pay the Billz Electricity
 Pro Sessions vol 22 - Sound of Unseen Worlds
 Pro Sessions vol 23 - Beats from Beyond 1
 Pro Sessions vol 24 - Pop/Rock Guitar Toolbox
 Pro Sessions vol 25 - Liquid Cinema - Cinematic Impact
 Pro Sessions vol 26 - Liquid Cinema - Cinematic Ambience
 Pro Sessions vol 27 - Liquid Cinema - Cinematic Pulse Audio Loop
 Pro Sessions vol 28 - Liquid Cinema - Tabla Science
 Pro Sessions vol 29 - Liquid Cinema - Junkyard Sessions
 Pro Sessions vol 30 - Liquid Cinema -  Late Nite Sessions 1
 Pro Sessions vol 31 - Liquid Cinema - Late Nite Sessions 2
 Pro Sessions vol 32 - Dope Beatz
 Pro Sessions vol 33 - Scratch'n Elements: Disc 1 Drums
 Pro Sessions vol 34 - Da Joints
 Pro Sessions vol 35 - Dance Static
 Pro Sessions vol 36 - Tension Theory
 Pro Sessions vol 37 - Field of Visions
 Pro Sessions vol 38 - Absolute World Fusion II
 Pro Sessions vol 40 - Electro Groove
 Pro Sessions vol 41 - Spooky Ghost
 Pro Sessions vol 42 - Discrete Drums : Funky Beats
 Pro Sessions vol 43 - Discrete Drums : Rock Drums
 Pro Sessions vol 44 - Discrete Drums : Slow Rock Drums
 Pro Sessions vol 45 - Discrete Drums : One Big World
 Pro Sessions vol 46 - Discrete Drums : More Funky Beats
 Pro Sessions vol 47 - Authentic Latin Hip Hop Funk Breaks
 Pro Sessions vol 48 - Hella Bumps 3
 Pro Sessions vol 49 - Dirty South 
 Pro Sessions vol 50 - Rice and Beans
 Pro Sessions vol 51 - Elektron: Monomachine
 Pro Sessions vol 52 - Dance Remix Toolkit 1 Essential dance music elements
 Pro Sessions vol 53 - Dance Remix Toolkit 2

See also
 List of studio monitor manufacturers

References

External links

 
 ICE1712 ALSA configuration

American brands
Audio equipment manufacturers of the United States
Companies based in Rhode Island
Companies established in 1988
Microphone manufacturers
Music equipment manufacturers
Sound cards